Huacaybamba is a town in central Peru, capital of Huacaybamba Province in Huánuco Region.

Populated places in the Huánuco Region